The '92 vs. '02 Collection is a 2002 EP by Guillermo Scott Herren released under the alias of Prefuse 73. It was released by Warp in 2002.

Style
Unlike his previous album Vocal Studies + Uprock Narratives, Herren styles was described by Exclaim! as "opting for more electronic-based noises, rather than chopped up hip-hop beats" while AllMusic called it a "calmer and more collected approach to instrumental hip hop".

Release
The '92 vs. '02 Collection was released in by Warp on June 24, 2002. The album was released on compact disc, vinyl and as an internet download.

Reception

Pitchfork Media gave the EP a 7.7 out of 10 rating, noting that the album was not a retread of his previous LP Vocal Studies + Uprock Narratives and not a sudden change of style either. The review highlighted the tracks "Desks.Pencils.Bottles" and "When Irony Wears Thin" while finding the final two tracks as "slightly less ear-catching." PopMatters praised the album specifically citing the track "Love You Bring" as "essential", only finding an issue with the releases brevity. Exclaim! echoed PopMatters statement of "Love You Bring" as a highlight. AllMusic referred to the release as a "pretty darn good one", but also found the album too short.

Track listing
Track listing from album liner notes.

Personnel
Credits adapted from The '92 vs. '02 Collection liner notes.
 Scott Herren – producer
 Tent – design
 Douglas Savage – photography

References

2002 EPs
Prefuse 73 EPs
Warp (record label) EPs